Theresa May (born 1956) served as Prime Minister of the United Kingdom from 2016 to 2019.

Therese May or Teresa May may also refer to:
 Therese May (born 1943), American artist known for mixed-media quilts
 Teresa Baker (née May), mother of Catherine Baker Knoll
 Teresa May, English model and actress who appeared in the 1997 music video "Smack My Bitch Up" by the Prodigy

See also
 Premiership of Theresa May, her premiership
 Tressa May, a nineteenth-century Oregon steamboat